Bob, Bobby or Robert Mann may refer to:

Bob Mann (American football) (1924–2006), American football player
Bob Mann (golfer) (born 1951), American golfer
Bob Mann (Canadian politician), Ontario Communist Party candidate
Bob Mann (guitarist) (born 1944), American guitarist/keyboardist
Bobby Mann (born 1974), Scottish footballer
Robert Mann (1920–2018), musician
Robert Mann (Louisiana historian), journalist and political historian at Louisiana State University
Robert Mann (Royal Navy officer) (1748–1813), British admiral
Robert James Mann (1817–1886), English physician and science writer